Stenodontes is a genus of beetles in the family Cerambycidae, containing the following species:

 Stenodontes chevrolati Gahan, 1890
 Stenodontes damicornis (Linnaeus, 1771)
 Stenodontes exsertus (Olivier, 1795)

References

Prioninae